ASPM may refer to:

 ASPM (gene), a human gene
 Active State Power Management, a computer power management protocol
 Aviation System Performance Metrics, an FAA database of the National Airspace System

See also
 Aspirant de marine, a French Canadian subordinate officer